De Adriaan may refer to:

 De Adriaan, Haarlem, a windmill in Haarlem, Netherlands
 De Adriaan, Veldhoven, a windmill in Veldhoven, Netherlands